Burudi is a village in the Ghatshila CD block in the Ghatshila subdivision of the East Singhbhum district, Jharkhand, India.

Geography

Location  

Burudi Dam 
Burudi Dam was built in the scenic surroundings of Dalma Hills during the British Raj.

Binda Mela (fair), held for a fortnight in October, presents Santali handicrafts, paintings, jewellery, lamps, pots and other rural items.

Area overview 
The area shown in the map “forms a part of the Chota Nagpur Plateau and is a hilly upland tract”.  The main rivers draining the district are the Subarnarekha and the Kharkai. The area lying between Jamshedpur and Ghatshila is the main industrial mining zone. The rest of the district is primarily agricultural. In the district, as of 2011,  56.9% of the population lives in the rural areas and a high 43.1% lives in the urban areas.

Note: The map alongside presents some of the notable locations in the district. All places marked in the map are linked in the larger full screen map.

Demographics 
According to the 2011 Census of India, Burudi had a total population of 293, of which 145 (49%) were males and 148 (51%) were females. Population in the age range 0–6 years was 43. The total number of literate persons in Burudi was 182 (72.80% of the population over 6 years).

(*For language details see Ghatshila block#Language and religion)

References 

Villages in East Singhbhum district